Louisiana Music is a website presenting classical music videos produced by the Louisiana Museum of Modern Art.

Content

The Great Romantics (2007 to 2009) 
 Brahms - Trio with clarinet interpreted by Paul Meyer, Jing Zhao and Éric Le Sage
 Brahms - Trio with horn interpreted by Bruno Schneider, Daishin Kashimoto and Éric Le Sage
 Fauré Quartet with piano interpreted by Daishin Kashimoto, Lise Berthaud, François Salque and Éric Le Sage
 Haendel / Halvorsen - Passacaille interpreted by Daishin Kashimoto and Jing Zhao
 Schumann - Piano Quartet interpreted by Daishin Kashimoto, Lise Berthaud, François Salque and Éric Le Sage
 Schumann - Quintett interpreted by Guy Braunstein, Daishin Kashimoto, Lise Berthaud, Jing Zhao and Eric Le Sage
 Weber - Grand Duo Concertant interpreted by Paul Meyer and Eric Le Sage

Guillaume Connesson | Chamber Music (2010) 
 Disco-Toccata interpreted by Florent Héau and Jérôme Pernoo
 Adams Variations interpreted by Sergey Malov, Florent Héau, Jérôme Pernoo and Jérôme Ducros
 Les Chants de l'Atlantide interpreted by Sergey Malov and Jérôme Ducros
 Les Chants de l'Agartha interpreted by Jérôme Pernoo and Jérôme Ducros
 Constellations interpreted by Lise Berthaud and Jérôme Ducros

Musical Clips (2011 - 2013)

Emmanuel Pahud 
 C.P.E. Bach - Allegro from Sonata in A minor
 Debussy - Syrinx
 Ferroud - Jade from Trois PIèces pour flûte seule
 Tchaikovsky - Lensky's Aria from Eugene Onegin

Christian Poltéra and Karen Gomyo 
 J.S. Bach - Sarabande from Suite No 1 in G major
 Arthur Honegger - Sonate for violin and cello
 Astor Piazzolla - Tango-Etude No 3

Sergey Malov 
 J.S. Bach - Invention No 1
 J.S. Bach - Sinfonia No 6

Denis Kozhukhin 
 Prokofiev - Precipitato

Interviews 
 Stéphan Aubé about the shooting of the Connesson's chamber music DVD
 Guillaume Connesson about the Sonatas
 Guillaume Connesson about the Constellations
 Guillaume Connesson about Disco Toccata
 Guillaume Connesson about the Adams Variations
 Denis Kozhukhin about the War Sonatas
 Sergey Malov about the Chants de l'Atlantide
 Sergey Malov about the shooting of the Bach's pieces
 Jérôme Pernoo about the Guillaume Connesson' Sonatas
 The making of a video with Christian Poltéra and Karen Gomyo

External links 
 
 Louisiana Music videos page
 Louisiana Music on Vimeo
 Louisiana Music on YouTube
 Louisiana Music on Facebook
 

Classical music in Denmark